Kvamme is a Norwegian name which may refer to:

People
E. Floyd Kvamme, American engineer, venture capitalist, and government advisor
Helge Kvamme, Norwegian jurist and businessperson
Mark Kvamme, American venture capitalist
Torstein Kvamme, Norwegian politician
Wenche Kvamme (1950–2019), Norwegian singer and actress

Places
Kvamme, Sogn og Fjordane, a village in Balestrand, Sogn og Fjordane county, Norway
Kvamme, Hordaland, a village in Lindås, Hordaland county, Norway

See also
Kvammen